Lieven Boeve [‘li:vən ‘bu:və] (born April 10, 1966 in Veurne) is a Belgian Catholic theologian, and is full professor of Systematic Theology at the Faculty of Theology and Religious Studies of the  Katholieke Universiteit Leuven, where he currently also serves as Dean of the Faculty. Since 2012 he is also the chair of the Centre for Academic Teacher’s Training, KU Leuven. On 1 August 2014 he became the Director General of the Flemish Secretary for Catholic Education (VSKO).

Research career 

In 1995 Boeve obtained his doctoral degree in Theology with a dissertation on the reception of postmodernity in theology. In 1997 he became part-time instructor at the KU Leuven, in 1999 he became full-time instructor. Between 1998 and 2003 he also lectured at the Faculty of Theology of the Université catholique de Louvain, Louvain-la-Neuve.

In 2000 he set up a research group Theology in a Postmodern Context, supporting about ten research and doctoral projects on a.o. the study of the ‘theological method’, Christian faith in the actual culture, and the relation between philosophy and theology. Meanwhile, he is also the coordinator of the GOA project on The Normativity of History, conducting historical-systematic research, and the interdisciplinary research group Anthropos.

From 2005 until 2009 Boeve was the international chair of the European Society of Catholic Theology.

Publications 

In 2003 Boeve published Interrupting Tradition. An Essay on Christian Faith in a Postmondern Context, followed by a second more methodological work on the relation between theology and the actual context: God Interrupts History. Theology in a Time of Upheaval. In 2013 he edited Tradition and the Normativity of History, together with Terrence Merrigan. In 2014 he published Lyotard and Theology. Beyond the Christian master narrative of love. In addition Boeve continued his reflections on the relationship between theology and the postmodern society in the book on theology in the university, the church and society, published in 2016, where he traces four models of Christian Identity in a Post-Christian society. He also published several articles in scientific journals and books.

Personal life 
Lieven Boeve lives in Leuven together with his wife Maryleen Verhavert and their three children.

References

External links 

Curriculum Vitae

1966 births
Living people
20th-century Belgian Roman Catholic theologians
People from Veurne
Academic staff of KU Leuven
21st-century Belgian Roman Catholic theologians